The United States ambassador to Guinea-Bissau is the official representative of the president of the United States to the head of state of Guinea-Bissau. The U.S. ambassador to Senegal is concurrently commissioned to Senegal and Guinea-Bissau.

Until 1974, Guinea-Bissau had been a colony of the Portuguese Empire as Portuguese Guinea. After a period of revolutionary warfare, Guinea-Bissau unilaterally declared its independence  on September 24, 1973. Following the April 1974 Carnation Revolution in Portugal, it granted independence to Guinea-Bissau on September 10, 1974. The United States recognized the Republic of Guinea-Bissau on the same day. The U.S. Embassy Bissau was established on June 30, 1976, with Dean Curran as Chargé d'Affaires ad interim.

The first three ambassadors to Guinea-Bissau were concurrently commissioned to Cape Verde while resident in Bissau. From 1983 until 1998, U.S. ambassadors were solely commissioned to Guinea-Bissau. In 1998 the U.S. embassy in Bissau was closed, and there has been no U.S. embassy in Bissau since then. Since 2002, the U.S. ambassador to Senegal has also been commissioned as the ambassador to Guinea-Bissau, while resident in Dakar.

Ambassadors and chiefs of mission

Notes

See also
Guinea-Bissau – United States relations
Foreign relations of Guinea-Bissau
Ambassadors of the United States

References
United States Department of State: Background notes on Guinea-Bissau

External links
 United States Department of State: Chiefs of Mission for Guinea-Bissau
 United States Department of State: Guinea-Bissau
 United States Virtual Consulate in Guinea-Bissau

Guinea-Bissau

United States